Edward Robert Low  (born 14 May 1943) is a musician from New Zealand.

Career
During the 1960s Eddie Low was a member of The Quin Tikis, touring with the annual Miss New Zealand pageant and with country singer Joe Brown.

He starred in the 1966 musical comedy film Don't Let It Get You. In 1970 he was signed to Joe Brown Records and released singles for the label, "Lonely Women Make Good Lovers" and "Help Me Make It Through the Night".

"In 2003 Low toured New Zealand as the star of the Roy Orbison tribute show. During the tour he received so many inquiries as to when he would be releasing a new album that as soon as the tour concluded, he started work on it."

Honours and awards 
 Member of the New Zealand Order of Merit, for services to music, in the 2006 Queen's Birthday Honours
 Country Music Legend Award, 2009
 Benny Award, Variety Artists Club of New Zealand

Discography
 The Voice in a Million: The Best of Eddie Low  (2011)

References

External links
 Biography on the Variety Artists Club

1943 births
Living people
New Zealand Māori male singers
Blind musicians
New Zealand musicians
Members of the New Zealand Order of Merit
20th-century New Zealand male singers
21st-century New Zealand male singers
New Zealand blind people